Jeffrey D. Watson (born March 25, 1971 in Windsor, Ontario) is the former Member of Parliament for the Essex electoral district in Ontario, 2004-2015 under Stephen Harper's Prime Ministership.

In the 2015 General Election, and after four terms in office, Watson narrowly lost his seat to the NDP. The Watsons relocated to Calgary, Alberta looking for a better life.

Watson and his wife Sarah have six children.

Member of Parliament for Essex, Ontario, 2004-2015 

Watson was first elected as the Member of Parliament for Essex in June 2004 and re-elected in January 2006 and October 2008 as a member of the Conservative Government led by Prime Minister Stephen Harper. Watson was the first centre-right MP elected for Essex or its predecessors in 46 years. He also had the distinction of being designated by the Library of Parliament as the first autoworker elected to the Parliament of Canada.

Watson served on the Standing Committee on the Environment & Sustainable Development and on the Standing Committee on Transportation, Infrastructure & Communities. He was also Chair of the Government Auto Caucus, a member of the All-Party border Caucus, and the Canada-UK, Canada-Italy Inter-Parliamentary Groups. As well he served as a member of the Executive and Vice-Chair respectively as a member of the Canada-Israel and Canada-US Inter-Parliamentary Groups.

In February 2007, Watson came under criticism for comments made at a hearing of the Special Legislative Committee on Canada's Clean Air Act that linked greenhouse gas reductions to a demise in the Canadian economy which could result in domestic violence and suicide. While in April 2007, the government tabled a report detailing how C-288 will plunge Canada into a recession costing 275,000 jobs, echoing the MPs concerns.

Following his studies in history and political science at the University of Windsor, Watson worked as an executive assistant and marketing director before joining the line at the Trim Division at Daimler Chrysler's Windsor Assembly Plant, where he was employed for seven years.

In January 2007, the Windsor Star reported that a former campaign worker from Watson's 2004 campaign threatened he would "kill Jeff Watson with (his) bare hands", was charged by the Ontario Provincial Police and sent to trial. The defendant was later acquitted as the Ontario court judge, Justice Lloyd Dean, could not conclude beyond a reasonable doubt that the words were spoken to intimidate or strike fear. "I had to deal with whether or not the matter was before the court because the young ladies [the witnesses] were fearful of Mr. Kouvalis or assessing what move to make and what evidence to give because they were concerned about the political consequences for Mr. Kouvalis, Mr. Watson and the Conservative party," the judge said. The case was complicated by the admission in court that "Witness Kaydee Schnekenburger, a former campaign worker for Watson .. testified earlier in the trial that she and Angela Jonsson, another witness .. met with Watson and his wife, Sarah, at the MP's home for three hours and discussed the sequence of events in the case.

Watson was re-elected in the 2008 federal election.

He became Parliamentary Secretary to the Minister of Transport on Sept.19, 2013.

In May 2015, the Jewish National Fund Windsor honoured Jeff Watson. "Over 500 people attended the event to pay tribute to Mr. Watson for his great work in serving [the Jewish] community and for his strong support of Israel. .. with a fascinating keynote address from The Honourable Jason Kenney."

Watson was defeated in 2015 by the New Democratic Party, despite a Liberal Party majority elsewhere in the country.

2015-present

In 2015, the Watsons relocated to Calgary, Alberta for their Children. Watson stated "The kids, some of them want to ride horses. My boys, 11 and 13 — they want to mountain bike extreme style. One of them wants to snowboard." Watson continued to on, "Asked if he’ll be getting into politics in Alberta, Watson said he’ll likely help out on the campaigns of friends like fellow Conservative Jason Kenney"

In 2017, Watson become the Director, Coalitions and Outreach for Unite Alberta / Jason Kenney Leadership.

In addition to being a member of Jason Kenney's campaign leadership team during 2016–17, Watson has also continued his work in Federal Politics and acts as an advisor to the Hon. Andrew Scheer.

Watson is also working with Ric McIver in the United Conservative Party held riding of Calgary-Hays as a Constituency Assistant.

Electoral record

References

External links
 Official Jeff Watson UCP Candidacy
 Archived MP website

1971 births
Conservative Party of Canada MPs
Living people
Members of the House of Commons of Canada from Ontario
People from Essex, Ontario
Politicians from Windsor, Ontario
University of Windsor alumni
21st-century Canadian politicians